This is a list of Italian television related events from 1989.

Events 

 November 9: the TG2 special correspondent Lilli Gruber (German native speaker) describes, for RAI, the fall of the Berlin Wall and the following events.

Debuts

Rai

News and educational 

 1989 Cartolina (Postcard) – daily column by Andrea Barbato, consisting of a five minutes open letter addressed to a personality of politics or everyday life; five seasons.

Fininvest

Variety 
Agenzia matrimoniale (Marriage agency) – people show, hosted by Marta Flavi (by then wife of the producer Maurizio Costanzo) and later by Barbara D’Urso; 9 seasons. In every episode, two lonely hearts have a blind date in front of the cameras.
C’eravamo tanto amati (Once we loved each other so much) – talk-show, hosted by Luca Barbareschi; 5 seasons. The program, forerunner of the future trash-TV, is focused on the angry quarrels (largely staged) of couples in crisis; despite its bad taste, it gets public success and has an American version (That’s amore).
Bellezze al bagno (Bathing beauties) – game show, aired in the summer from the most famous Italian water parks; 5 seasons.

Television shows

Rai

Drama 

 Una donna spezzata – by Marco Leto, from Simone de Beauvoir’s La femme rompue, with Lea Massari and Erland Josephson, in 2 parts. A middle-class woman has to face the crumbling of her seemingly happy family.
 Uomo contro uomo (Man vs. man) – by Sergio Sollima, with Christopher Bucholz and Barbara De Rossi, in 2 parts. It’s the story of a men of honor in the Calabrian ‘ndrangheta and of his sister, a teacher enemy of the organized crime. 
The jeweler’s shop – by Michael Anderson, from the Karol Woytila’s play, with Burt Lancaster and Olivia Hussey.

Miniseries 

 I promessi sposi (The betrothed) – by Salvatore Nocita, from the Alessandro Manzoni’s novel, with  Danny Quinn and Delphine Forest as protagonists and a stellar cast in the minor roles (Alberto Sordi, Burt Lancaster, F. Murray Abraham, Franco Nero, Dario Fo); in 5 episodes. Realized with a 20 billion liras budget, in coproduction with Bayerischer Rundfunk  and the Croatian television, the series gets high ratings in Italy; it’s instead ravaged by critics, who reproach it the infidelity to the book, transformed into a cloak and dagger story, and the mediocrity of the two lead actors.
Modì, vita di Amedeo Modigliani (Life of Amedeo Modigliani) – by Franco Brogi Taviani, with Richard Berry in the title role; 3 episodes.
The last days of Pompei, by Peter Hunt, from the Edward Bulwer-Lytton’s novel, with Nicholas Clay, Olivia Hussey and Franco Nero; 4 episodes.

Variety 

 Ars Amanda – malicious talk show, hosted by Amanda Lear, set in a bed where the singer and her guests chats about eroticism.

News and educational 

 La notte della repubblica (The night of the republic) – by Sergio Zavoli; monumental enquiry in 18 episodes about the Years of lead, with precious witnesses of many protagonists of the tragic season, politicians or terrorists.

Fininvest

Serial 
Cristina – sequel of Arriva Cristina, with Cristina D’Avena.

References 

1989 in Italian television